The Centre d'analyse stratégique is a decision-making and expertise institution under the authority of the French Prime Minister. Established by decree on 6 March 2006, the Centre's mission is to advise the Government in the creation and application of economic, social, environmental and cultural policy. It was the successor to the long-lasting and powerful Plan Commission (Commissariat général du Plan).

At the request of the Prime Minister, it provides forecasts for major governmental reforms.

On its own initiative, it carries out studies and analysis as part of an annual working program.

It gives particular attention to the European dimension of the questions it examines.

It draws upon an 11-member Steering Committee that includes two Deputies, two Senators and a member of the economic and social council (Conseil économique et social).

It consists of a permanent team of experts and scientific advisors drawn from the world of research.

It liaises with the principal consulting and expertise advisors in the Prime Minister's service: the Conseil d’Orientation pour l’Emploi, the Conseil d’Analyse de la Société, the Conseil de l’Emploi, des Revenus et de la Cohésion sociale, the Conseil d’Analyse Economique, the Haut Conseil d’Intégration and the Conseil d’Orientation des Retraites.

Conveniently located at the heart of the national and European advisory networks, the Centre d'Analyse Stratégique enjoys the support of the following organisations in the running of its own projects: French ministries and administrative bodies, European Union, think-tanks and foundations, Foreign correspondents, etc.

All of the Centre's work is made public on its official site and in printed editions by La Documentation française.

Each year, the Centre also organizes around a dozen public events, including seminars, colloquiums and one-day conferences.

Finally, the Centre d'analyse stratégique publishes an annual report summarizing that year's work.

External links
 Official site
 Work programme
 Policy briefs
 Reports

The Centre d'analyse stratégique’s four research areas:
 Economy and Financial Affairs Department
 Social Affairs Department
 Sustainable Development Department
 Labour and Employment Department

References
 Decree 2006-260 creating the strategic analysis centre (on Legifrance)

Government agencies of France
Economic policy in Europe
Government agencies established in 2006
2006 establishments in France
Government agencies disestablished in 2013
2013 disestablishments in France